The Mangatete River or Mangatete Stream is a river of the Northland Region of New Zealand's North Island. It flows northwest from its origins to the east of Kaitaia, reaching the Rangaunu Harbour to the east of Awanui.

See also
List of rivers of New Zealand

References

Far North District
Rivers of the Northland Region
Rivers of New Zealand